The Election Support Group (ESG) is an internationally sponsored organization which means to provide analysis and support to the electoral process in Pakistan. The secretariat for the group is the Pakistan branch of the International Foundation for Electoral Systems.

Activities

ESG made 32 major recommendation to the Pakistani Election commission in 2009. These recommendations were issued in January 2009. These recommendations were made by ESG based on the analysis of recommendations provided by 16 international organizations on the reform of the Electoral System of Pakistan.

Member organizations

The following organization sponsor ESG:

British High Commission in Islamabad
Embassy of Netherlands in Pakistan
U.S. Embassy in Islamabad 
Royal Norwegian Embassy in Pakistan
European Commission
Department for International Development (U.K.)
International Foundation for Electoral Systems
National Democratic Institute
Free and Fair Election Network
The Asia Foundation (TAF)
United Nations Development Programme
USAID

References

Elections in Pakistan
Pakistani democracy movements